The GLAAD Media Award for Outstanding Film – Wide Theatrical Release is an annual award that honors films that received a wide release for excellence in the depiction of LGBT (lesbian, gay, bisexual, and transgender) characters and themes. It is one of several categories of the annual GLAAD Media Awards, which are presented by GLAAD—an American non-governmental media monitoring organization founded in 1985, formerly called the Gay & Lesbian Alliance Against Defamation—at ceremonies in New York City, Los Angeles, and San Francisco between March and June.

The award was given for the first time during the 2nd GLAAD Media Awards in 1991 to Longtime Companion, distributed by The Samuel Goldwyn Company, and The Handmaid's Tale, distributed by Cinecom. There were only two more instances in which two films shared the award: Frankie and Johnny and Fried Green Tomatoes in 1992, and The Adventures of Priscilla, Queen of the Desert and Go Fish in 1995. While no film was recognized in 1993, the award has been present at every ceremony since 1994. At the 7th GLAAD Media Awards, a clear distinction was made between films that received a wide release versus a limited release, with this award being titled as Outstanding Studio Film, before being retitled to Outstanding Film – Wide Release the following year. Due to the impact of the COVID-19 pandemic on cinema, during the ceremonies in 2021 and 2022, the category also included films released by major studios on streaming services for a premium fee of $19 or more. Starting with the 2023 ceremony, due to the reorganization of the categories, this award now excludes streaming films and was retitled to its current name.

For a film to be eligible, it must be released by a recognized film distribution company and play for paid admission in Los Angeles for seven consecutive days. Wide release is defined by a combination of criteria such as the numbers of screens, budget, and visibility. The award may be accepted by any of the film's producers, directors, writers, or actors. Wide-released films selected by GLAAD are evaluated based on four criteria: "Fair, Accurate, and Inclusive Representations" of the LGBT community, "Boldness and Originality" of the project, significant "Impact" on mainstream culture, and "Overall Quality" of the project. GLAAD monitors mainstream media to identify which films will be nominated, while also issuing a Call for Entries that encourages media outlets to submit films for consideration. By contrast, in order for films created by and for LGBT audiences to be considered for nomination, they must be submitted after the Call for Entries. Winners are determined by a plurality vote by GLAAD staff and its board, Shareholders Circle members, volunteers and affiliated individuals.

Since its inception, the award has been given to 34 films. At the 33rd GLAAD Media Awards in 2022, the award was given to Eternals, distributed by Walt Disney Studios Motion Pictures.

Winners and nominees
Initially, GLAAD only announced the winners during press releases, with the awards being given during the ceremonies. For the 7th GLAAD Media Awards in 1996, GLAAD made the list of nominees in this category publicly available, announcing the winner at a latter date. Since then, the nominees in all categories have been made public.

1990s

2000s

2010s

2020s

Notes

References

Film Wide
Awards for best film
LGBT film awards